This is a list of military academies in the
United States which are now defunct. Some of these schools have been absorbed into other organizations, or continued under changed name.

A
Abingdon Male Academy (VA)
Admiral Billard Naval Academy (CT)
 Admiral Farragut Academy (NJ)
Advance Military Academy (AR)
Aiken Military Academy (SC)
Alabama Military Institute (AL)
Alabama Military & Scientific Institute (AL)
Alachua Military Institute (FL)
Alamo Military Academy (TX)
Albany Military Academy (NY)
Albemarle Military Institute (VA)
Alexander Institute (AR)
Alexander Military Institute (NY)
Allen Military Academy (TX)
Allen Military School (MA)
Amarillo Military Academy (TX)
American Classical and Military Lyceum (PA)
American Literary Scientific and Military Academy (VT)
American Military Academy (CA)
Ames Military School
Anchorage Classical and Military Academy (KY)
Anderson Military Academy (CA)
Arizona Military Academy (AZ)
Arkansas Military Academy (AR)
Arkansas Military Institute (AR)
Army & Navy Preparatory School (MD)
Arrow Rock Military Academy (MO)
Arsenal Academy (SC)
Asheville Military Academy (MA)
Ashfield Military Academy (AR)
Astoria Military Academy (NY)
Atlanta Air Academy (NH)
Auburn Military Academy
Augusta Military Academy (VA)
Austin Military Academy (TX)
Austin Normal Military School (TX)

B
Bailey Military Institute (SC)
Barbour Hall Junior Military Academy (MI)
Bard Hall (NY)
Barnard Military School (NY)
Bastrop Military Institute (TX)
Baylor School (TN)
Bealey Military Academy (OR)
Beaumont Military Academy (OR)
Belmont Military Academy (CA)
Benedictine Military Institute (GA)
Bethel Military Academy (VA)
Betts Military Academy (CT)
Bingham Military School (NC)
Bingham's Military School (MD)
Bishop Military Academy (TX)
Bishop Quarter Junior Military Academy (IL)
Bishop Scott Military Academy (OR)
Black-Foxe Military Institute (CA)
Blackstone Military Academy (VA)
Blakely Military Institute (GA)
Blees Military Academy (MO)
Bolles School of Florida (FL)
Bordentown Military Institute (NJ)
Bowden Collegiate & Military Institute (GA)
Brandon State Military Institute (MS)
Branham and Hughes Military Academy (TN)
Breck Military School
Brennan's Military Academy (TN)
Brentwood Military Academy (CA)
Brentwood Military Academy (OH)
Briarley Hall Military Academy (MD)
Bridgeport Commercial & Military Academy (CT)
Brier Patch Military School
Brook Military Academy (OH)
Brown Military Academy (CA)
Brown Military Academy (CT)
Brownsville Military Academy (TN)
The Bullis School (MD)
Bunker Hill Military Academy (IL)
Burbank Military Academy (CA)
Burlington Military Academy/College (NJ)
Burnside Military School (VT)

C
Calvary Military Academy (NY)
Camden Point Military Institute (MO)
Cape Fear Military Academy (NC)
Captain James D. Cobb's Military School (VA)
Cardinal Farley Military Academy (NY)
Carlin Military Academy (CA)
Carlisle Military Institute (TX)
Carlisle Military School (SC)
Carolina Military Academy (NC)
Carolina Military Institute (NC)
Carolina Military-Naval Academy (NC)
Carson Military and Naval Institute (MI)
Carson Long Military Institute  (PA)
Castle Heights Military Academy (TN)
Caswell Academy (NY)
Catawba Military Academy (NC)
Catawba Military Academy (SC)
Cayuga Lake Military Academy (NY)
Chaddock Boys School (IL)
Chamberlain Military Institute (NY)
Charlotte Hall Military Academy (MD)
Charlotte Military Institute (NC)
Chapultepec Military Academy (TX)
Chauncey Hall School (MA)
Cheltenham Military Academy (PA)
Cheshire Military Academy (CT)
Chester Military Academy
Cheviot Hills Military Academy (CA)
Christian Brother College Military High School (MO)
Church Military School (MD)
Churchill's Military Academy (NY)
Clason Point Military Academy (NY)
Clinton Liberal Institute & Military Academy (NY)
Coe Military Academy (IL)
Collegiate Institute (NC)
Colonel Edgar's Military Academy (KY)
Colorado Military School (CO)
Columbia Military Academy (TN)
Connecticut Military Academy (CT)
Cook Academy (NY)
Coral Gables Military Academy (FL)
Cornado Military Academy (CA)
Corpus Christi Military Academy (TX)
Cromwell Military Academy (CA)
Crossed Rifles Military Academy
Croton Military Institute (NY)

D
Danforth Military Academy (WI)
Danville Classical & Military Institute (KY)
Danville Military Institute (VA)
DeBerry Military Academy (TN)
Delaware Military Academy (DE) The current Delaware Military Academy was established in 2003.
De La Salle Military Academy (MO)
Davis Military Academy (CA)
Davis Military School (NC)
De La Salle Military Academy (MO)
Del Monte Military Academy (CA)
De Meritte Military Academy (NJ)
De Veaux School (NY)
De Vitte Military Academy (NJ)
Donaldson Military School (NC)
Dr. Holbrook's Military School (NY)

E
Eagleswood Military Academy (NJ)
East Florida Seminary (NJ)
Eastern Military Academy (NY)
Eastern Military Academy (CT)
Edgar Military School (AL)
Edgehill Military School (NJ)
 Edwards Military Institute (NC)
El Paso Military Institute (TX)
Elberton Military Academy (GA)
Elm City Military Institute (CT)
Elsinore Naval & Military School (CA)
Endymion Military School (NY)
Episcopal Military Institute (KS)
Epworth Military Academy (IA)
Etowah Military Institute (GA)
Everest Military Academy (CT)

F
Fayetteville Literary, Scientific and Military School (NC)
Fayetteville Military Academy (NC)
Ferrell Military School (KY)
Ferrell's Military Institute (LA)
Fitzgerald and Clark School (TN)
Fleetwood Academy (VA)
Florida Collegiate & Military Institute (FL)
Florida Military Academy (FL)
Florida Military Institute (FL)
Florida Military School & College (FL)
Florida Naval Academy (FL)
Forest Military Academy (KY)
Forest Military School (TX)
Fort Worth Military Academy (TX)
Francis Military Academy (NJ)
Franklin Military Institute (VA)
Franklin Military School (NC)
Frederick Military Academy (VA)
Free Military School (PA)
Freehold Military School (NJ)
French Camp Military Academy (MS)

G
Garden Military Academy (TX)
General McArthur Military Academy (NJ)
General Pan tops Academy (AL)
Georgia Military Academy (GA)
Georgia Military Institute (GA)
Georgia Southern Military College (GA)
Gideon s Military Academy (TX)
Gibson F. Hill's Military Academy (AL)
Glen Turner Military School (CA)
Glenlivet Male Collegiate & Military Institute (AL)
Golden State Military Academy (CA)
Golden West Military Academy (CA)
Gordon Military College (GA)
Goss Military Institute (NM)
Grand Prairie Seminary (IL)
Green Gate Military School (UNK)
Green ville Military Academy (MS)
Greenville Military Institute (SC)
Greenbrier Military School (WV)
Gulf Coast Military Academy (MS)
Gymnasium and Military Institute (NH)

H
Haggett Military Academy (KY)
Hampton Military Academy (VA)
Hanson's Military Academy (IL)
Harding Military Academy (CA)
Harding Military School (TX)
Harker Academy (CA) (Now, The Harker School)
Harris Military Institute (VA)
Harrisburg Military Academy (PA)
Harvard Military Academy (TX)
Harvard Military School (CA)
Henderson Military & Female Institute (NC)
Highland Park Military Academy (MA)
Highland Military Academy (MA)
Hill Military Academy (OR)
Hillsboro Military Academy
Hillsborough Military Academy (NC)
Hinfield Academy (VA)
Hitchcock Military Academy (CA)
Hoge Memorial Military Academy (VA)
Hogsett Military Academy (KY)
Hollywood Military Academy (CA)
Hollywood Military Academy (CA)
Honolulu Military Academy (HI)
Hoover Military Academy (VA)
Horner Military School (NC)
Howe Military Academy (IN)
Hudson River Military Academy (NY)
Huntsville Military Academy (AL)
Hurt Military School (AL)

I
Illinois Military School (IL)
Ingles Military High School (GA)
Inter-American Military Academy (FL)
Irving Military Academy (IL)
Isaac Shelby County Military Academy (KY)

J
Jackson Military Academy & School of Fine Arts (MO)
Jarvis Military Academy (CT)
Jarvis Hall Military Academy (CO)
Jefferson Military College (MS)
Jefferson Military School (GA)
John F. Kennedy Military School
John Holbrook's Military School (DC)
Jones Military School (NC)
Jordan Hall Military School (VT)
Junior Military Academy (TN)
Junior Military Academy (IL)

K
Kamehameha Military School (HI)
Kanawha Military Institute (WV)
Kansas Military Academy (KS)
Kearney Military Academy (NE)
Kelley Military Academy (KS)
Kemper Military School & Junior College (MO)
Kentucky Military Institute (KY)
Kenyon Military Academy (OH)
King's Mountain Military School (SC)
Kinston Military Institute (NC)
Kirkwood Military Academy (MO)
Kyle Military Institute (NY)

La Fayette Military Academy (GA)
La Monte Military Academy (CA)
Lagrange College & Military Academy (AL)
Lagrange Military Academy (AL)
La Grange Military Academy (TN)
La Salle Military Academy (NY)
Le Mans Academy (IN)
Lancaster Military Academy (TX)
Latah Military Academy (WA)
Lawrenceburg Military Academy
Lee Military Academy (VA)
Lenoir County Military School (NC)
Linsly Military Institute (WV)
Linton_Hall_Military_School (VA)
Literary, Scientific and Military Academy (NJ)
Livingston Military Academy (AL)
Lodwick Aviation Military Academy (FL)
Long Beach Military Academy (CA)
Los Angeles Military Academy (CA)
Los Ceritos Military Academy (CA)
Louisiana Military Academy (LA)
Louisiana State Seminary of Learning & Military Academy (LA)
Louisville Military Academy (KY)
Lovejoy Military Academy (NC)
Lowery-Phillips School (TX)
Lukin Military Academy (TX)
Lynnland Military Institute (KY)

M
Macon Military Academy (MO)
Madison Military Academy (CT)
The Manlius School (NY)
Mantua Classical & Military Academy (PA)
Marcell Military Academy (CA)
Marengo Military Institute (AL)
Marmaduke Military Academy (MO)
Marmion Military Academy (IL)
Maryland Agricultural College (later University of Maryland at College Park) (MD)
Maryland Military and Naval Academy (MD)
Marymount Military Academy (WA)
Massey Military School (TN)
McCallie School (TN)
McDonogh School (MD)
McMinn Military Academy (TN)
Media Milicademy for Young Boys (PA)
Meridian Military School & College (MS)
Miami Military Academy (FL)
Miami Military Institute of the Ohio Military College (OH)
Michigan Military Academy (MI)
Midwest Junior Military School (IL)
Midwest Military Academy (IL)
Millard Preparatory School for West Point (DC)
Millard School (OR)
Miller School of Albemarle (VA)
Millersburg Military Institute (KY)
Mississippi Military Academy (MS)
Missouri Literary, Scientific & Military Academy (MO)
Mitchell Military Boys School (MA)
Mobile Military Institute (AL)
Mohegan Military Academy (NY)
Mohican Military Academy (NY)
Montclair Military Academy (NJ)
Montrose Military Academy (NJ)
Morgan Park Military Academy (IL)
Mt. Beacon Military Academy (NY)
Mt. Lowe Military Academy (CA)
Mt. Pleasant Military Academy (NY)
Mount Saint Joseph Semi-Military Academy (NY)
Mount Sterling Literary, Scientific and Military Academy (KY)
Mount Tamalpais Military Academy (CA)
Mt. Vernon Military Academy (IL)
Mountville Military Institute (GA)
Moye Military School (TX)
Murphreesboro Military Academy (TN)

N
Nashville Military Academy (TN)
National Scientific and Military Academy (DE)
Nazareth Hall Military Academy (PA)
Nazareth Hall Military School (OH)
Nebraska Military Academy (NE)
New Bern Military Academy (NC)
New England Military Academy (MA)
New Hampshire Military Academy (NH)
New Jersey Military Academy (NJ)
New Jersey Naval Academy (NJ)
New Orleans Military Academy (LA)
Newport News Military Academy (VA)
Newton Hall Military Academy (NJ)
North Carolina Military Academy (NC)
North Carolina Military Institute (NC)
North Granville Military Academy (NY)
North Shore Military Academy (IL)
Northern Missouri Academy (MO)
Northridge Military Academy (CA)
Northwestern Military Academy (IL)

O
Oak Hill Military Academy (NC)
Oakland Military Academy (CA)
Oakland Military Academy (NJ)
Ogden Military Academy (UT)
Ohio Military College (OH)
Ohio Military Institute (OH)
Oklahoma Air Academy (OK)
Oklahoma Military Academy (OK)
Old Dominion Military Academy (VA)
Old Point Comfort Military School (VA)
Onarga Military School (IL)
Oneonta Military Academy (CA)
Orange Military Academy (NJ)
Oregon Military Academy (OR)

P
Pacific Maritime Academy (HI)
Pacific Military Academy (CA)
Page Military School (CA)
Palm Beach Military Academy (FL)
Palo Alto Military Academy (CA)
Park Military Academy (CA)
Park Ridge Military Academy (IL)
Partridge Military Academy (CT)
Paterson Military Academy (NJ)
Patrick Military Institute (SC)
Peacock Military Academy (TX)
Pecks Military Academy (CT)
Peekskill Military Academy (NY)
Pennsylvania Literary, Scientific and Military Academy (PA)
Pennsylvania Military Academy (PA)
Pennsylvania Military College (PA)
Pennsylvania Military Institute (PA)
Pershing Military Institute (CA)
Petersburg Military Academy (VA)
Phelps Military Academy (UNK)
Philadelphia Military Academy (PA)
Pillsbury Military Academy (MN)
Pine Forest Military Academy (NY)
Pine Ridge Military Academy (NJ)
Ponca Military Academy (OK)
Porter Military Academy (SC)
Poughkeepsie Military Institute (NY)
Puget Sound Naval Academy (aka Hill Naval Academy) (WA)
Pullman Military Academy (WA)
Putnam Military Academy (OH)

Q
Quincy Military Academy (FL)

R
Racine Military School (WI)
Raenford Military School (CA)
Raleigh Military Academy (NC)
Ramsey Military School (CA)
Rappahannock Academy & Military Institute (VA)
Redondo Military Academy (CA)
Rhodes Military Institute (NC)
Rice Creek Spring Military Academy (SC)
Richmond County Military Academy (GA)
Ridgewood Military Academy (CA)
Ringgold Military Academy (VA)
Riverview Military Academy (NY)
Rock River Military Academy (IL)
Rockingham Military Institute (VA)
Rockland Military Academy (NH)
Roosevelt Military Academy (IL)
Roosevelt Military Academy (NJ)
Rugby Military Academy (KY)
Rugby Military Academy (LA)
Rugby Military Academy (NY)
Russell Military Academy (CT)
Rumford Academy (VA)
Rutherfordton Military Institute
Rutland Military School (VT)

S
Sackett Harbor Military Academy (NY)
Sacred Heart Military Academy (IN)
Sacred Heart Military Academy (NY)
St. Albans Academy
St. Aloyisius Military Academy (OH)
St. Austin's Military School (NY)
St. Charles Military College (MO)
St. Edwards Military Academy (TX)
St. Emma Military Academy (VA)
St. James Military Academy (MO)
St. James Military Academy (MN)
St. John's Academy (VA)
St. John's Academy (CA)
St. John's Military School (KS)
St. John's Military Academy (WI)
St. John's Military School (NY)
St. Joseph College & Military Academy (KS)
St. Joseph's Jr Military Academy (PA)
St. Joseph's Military Academy (CA)
St. Louis Military Academy (MO)
St. Matthews Military Academy (CA)
St. Matthews Military Academy (CA)
St. Matthew's Hall Military School
St. Norbert Military College (WI)
St. Patrick's Military Academy (NY)
St. Paul Military Academy (VA)
Salem Military Academy (KY)
Salisbury Military School (NC)
St. Joseph's Jr Military Academy (PA)
San Diego Military Academy (CA)
San Rafael Military Academy (CA)
Sanford Naval Academy (FL)
Schatlock Hall Military Academy (MN)
Schreiner Institute (TX)
Scientific and Military Collegiate Institute (PA)
Seale Military Academy (CA)
Selleck Overlook Military Academy (CT)
Selma Military Institute (AL)
Sepulveda Military Academy (CA)
Sewanee Military Academy (TN)
Shattuck Military School (MN)
Shelby Military Institute (TN)
Sierra Military Academy (CA)
Silver Lake Military & Naval School (NY)
Sing Sing Military Academy (NY)
South Carolina Military Academy (SC)
South Florida Military Academy (FL)
South Florida Military and Educational Institute (FL)
South Norwalk Military Institute (CT)
Southern California Military Academy (CA)
Southern Military Academy (GA)
Southern Military Institute (VA)
Southwestern Military Academy (CA)
Southwestern Military Academy (AZ)
Spears-Langfod Military Academy (AR)
Springside Military Institute (MA)
Stamford Military Academy (CT)
Stamford Military Academy (NY)
Starr's Military Academy (NY)
Staunton Military Academy (VA)
Stella Niagara Cadet School (NY)
Stonehurst Military and Naval Academy (CA)
Suffield Military Academy (CT)
Suffolk Military Academy (VA)
Sumter Military Academy (SC)
Sweetwater Military College (TN)

T
Talladega Military Academy (AL)
Tampa Military Academy (FL)
Taylor Military School (AL)
Tennessee Military Institute (TN)
Texas Military College (TX)
Texas Monument & Military Institute (TX)
Torrance Military Academy (CA)
Trinity Military Institute (NY)
Tupelo Military Institute (MS)
Tugalo Institute (GA)

U
Unity Scientific & Military Academy (NH)
University Military Academy (MO)
University Military School (AL)
University Military School (TX)
Urban Military Academy (CA)

V
 Verner Military Institute (AL)
Vireum Military Academy (NY)
Virginia Literary, Scientific, & Military Academy (VA)

W
Warren County Military Institute (KY)
Webster Military Institute (VA)
Welch Military Academy (MO)
Wenonah Military Academy (NJ)
Wentworth Military Academy (MO)
West Alabama Institute (AL)
West Coast Military Academy (CA)
West Florida Seminary (FL)
West Lake Military Academy (CA)
Westchester Military Academy (TX)
Western Military Academy (IL)
Western Military Institute (KY & TN)
Western Springs Military Academy
Westover Military Academy (VA)
Weymans Military School (MO)
Williams Military Academy (IL)
Williamsburg Military Academy (VA)
Wilmington Literary, Scientific and Military Academy (DE)
Wilson Military Academy (NJ)
Worthington Military Academy (NE)
Worrall Hall Military Academy (NY)
Wright's Military Academy (AL)
Wyler Military School (FL)
Wytheville Military Academy (VA)

X

Y
Yonkers Military Institute (NY)

Z

See also
 United States military academies
 US military staff colleges

References

Military Academies
Military Academies, United States
Military Academies, Defunct
+Defunct
Military Academies, Defunct